Kuhnert Arboretum is a  arboretum and nature area located at the corner of Melgaard Road and Dakota Street South, Aberdeen, South Dakota. The arboretum contains deciduous, coniferous, and ornamental trees, as well as large shrubs.  The Arboretum is also home to a 9-hole disc golf course of easy difficulty level.  The course is lined by two roads, Moccasin Creek, and an open field.

See also
 List of botanical gardens in the United States

External links

Arboreta in South Dakota
Botanical gardens in South Dakota
Protected areas of Brown County, South Dakota
Aberdeen, South Dakota